The cycling competitions of the 2018 Asian Games were held at two venues in Subang and two venues in Jakarta from 20 August to 31 August 2018. 
Road bicycle racing was held around the road of Subang from 22 to 24 August 2018, while track cycling was contested at the Jakarta International Velodrome from 27 to 31 August 2018, mountain biking was contested at Khe Bun Hill in Subang on from 20 to 21 August 2018, and BMX racing was contested at the Pulomas International BMX Center on 25 August 2018.

Schedule

Medalists

BMX

Mountain bike

Road

Track

Medal table

Participating nations
A total of 286 athletes from 25 nations competed in athletics at the 2018 Asian Games:

References

External links
BMX
Mountain Bike
Road
Track
Official Result Book – Cycling BMX
Official Result Book – Cycling Mountain Bike
Official Result Book – Cycling Road
Official Result Book – Cycling Track

 
2018
2018 Asian Games events
Asian Games
Asian Games